Leslie Henry Staverton Mathews (1 March 1875 – 7 April 1946) was an English first-class cricketer and educator.

Mathews was born at Kensington in March 1875. He was educated at St Paul's School, before going up to Balliol College, Oxford. While studying at Oxford, he made two appearances in first-class cricket for Oxford University in 1897 against the Gentlemen of Philadelphia at Oxford and the Marylebone Cricket Club at Lord's. Mathews also boxed as a heavyweight for Oxford against Cambridge in 1897.

After graduating from Oxford, he became an assistant master at St Paul's in 1899. Mathews died at Fulham in April 1946.

References

External links

1875 births
1946 deaths
Sportspeople from Kensington
People educated at St Paul's School, London
Alumni of Balliol College, Oxford
English cricketers
Oxford University cricketers
English male boxers
Schoolteachers from London